is a tram station on the Tokyo Sakura Tram in Arakawa, Tokyo, Japan, operated by Tokyo Metropolitan Bureau of Transportation (Toei). It is 4.6 kilometres from the starting point of the Tokyo Sakura Tram at Minowabashi Station.

Layout
Arakawa-shakomae Station has two opposed side platforms.

History
The station opened on April 1, 1913.

Railway stations in Japan opened in 1913
Arakawa, Tokyo
Railway stations in Tokyo